St. Elmo is a 1923 British silent drama film directed by Rex Wilson and starring Shayle Gardner, Gabrielle Gilroy and Madge Tree. It was an adaptation of the 1866 novel St. Elmo by Augusta Jane Evans. An American adaptation St. Elmo was released the same year.

Cast
 Shayle Gardner - St. Elmo Murray
 Gabrielle Gilroy - Agnes Powell
 Madge Tree - Mrs. Murray
 Harding Thomas - Reverend Hammond

References

External links

1923 films
1923 drama films
Films directed by Rex Wilson
Films based on American novels
British drama films
British black-and-white films
British silent feature films
1920s British films
Silent drama films